The 2018 FIM Ice Speedway World Championship was the 53rd edition of FIM Individual Ice Racing World Championship season. The world champion was determined by ten races hosted in five cities Astana, Tolyatti, Berlin, Inzell and Heerenveen between 3 February and 8 April 2018. The Championships were sponsored by Lukoil.

Dmitry Koltakov of Russia was dominant throughout the World Championship series, winning nine of the ten rounds. This was Koltakov's third World title.

Final Series

Classification

See also 
 2018 Team Ice Racing World Championship

References 

Ice speedway competitions
World